Bo Smith (born June 8, 1983) is a former professional Canadian football defensive back. He signed with the BC Lions of the CFL in 2007. Smith played football collegiately at the University of Kentucky before transferring to Weber State during his senior year.

Smith has also been a member of the New York Jets.

College career
Smith was the starting cornerback for three years at the University of Kentucky. Prior to the 2006 season, Smith was dismissed by Kentucky after he was found to be in violation of team rules. Subsequently, Smith finished his collegiate career at Weber State. During his brief tenure at Weber, Smith played well enough to receive an invitation to the 2007 NFL Combine.

A hamstring injury at the combine would sideline Smith who was unable to generate interest from any NFL teams following the injury.

Professional career

BC Lions
Smith signed with the CFL BC Lions on May 28, 2007.

Hamilton Tiger-Cats
In 2008, Smith signed with the Hamilton Tiger-Cats.

New York Jets
On January 8, 2010, Smith was signed to a reserve future contract by the New York Jets following his stand out season with the Hamilton Tiger-Cats in 2009 when he only allowed four touchdown receptions. Smith was waived by the team on September 4, 2010.

Hamilton Tiger-Cats (II)
On September 21, 2010, Smith rejoined the Tiger-Cats. On May 15, 2013 Smith was released by the Tiger-Cats.

Winnipeg Blue Bombers
On August 20, 2013, Smith signed with the Winnipeg Blue Bombers.

Ottawa Redblacks
On February 13, 2014, Smith signed with the Ottawa Redblacks. He was released by the Redblacks on April 16, 2014.

References

External links
Hamilton Tiger-Cats bio
Ottawa Redblacks bio
New York Jets bio

1983 births
Living people
Sportspeople from Owensboro, Kentucky
American football safeties
Kentucky Wildcats football players
Weber State Wildcats football players
American players of Canadian football
Canadian football defensive backs
BC Lions players
Hamilton Tiger-Cats players
Ottawa Redblacks players
New York Jets players